Luis Prieto Zalbidegoitia (born 19 February 1979) is a Spanish retired footballer who played mainly as a central defender.

He amassed La Liga totals of 182 games and eight goals over the course of eight seasons, representing in the competition Athletic Bilbao and Valladolid.

Football career
Prieto was born in Bilbao, Biscay. Coming through the ranks of Athletic Bilbao, he spent three seasons on loan at two Basque neighbours before establishing himself in the main squad. His first-team debut came in 2002–03's opening round, a 2–4 away defeat against Real Sociedad.

In the 2005–06 campaign, as Athletic finished 12th in La Liga, Prieto scored four goals in 36 games, notably the deciders (1–0 wins) at RCD Mallorca and with CA Osasuna. After having appeared just three times during 2007–08, he left the Lions and joined fellow top flight club Real Valladolid, on 10 July 2008: a regular starter in his first year, he saw time at stopper and right back.

On 31 July 2009, Prieto was involved in a pre-season game against Ipswich Town, played in honour of the late Bobby Robson who died that morning, and scored an own goal in an eventual 1–3 loss to the Championship side. He appeared slightly less in the 2009–10 league campaign, mainly due to the signing in January 2010 of Portuguese Henrique Sereno. On 16 May, he opened the score as Valladolid certified its relegation after three years after losing 0–4 at eventual champions FC Barcelona.

After retiring as a player, Prieto became a coach focussing on fitness aspects. He spent time working with the youth categories of Athletic Bilbao at the club's Lezama training centre.

References

External links

1979 births
Living people
Spanish footballers
Footballers from Bilbao
Association football defenders
La Liga players
Segunda División players
Segunda División B players
Tercera División players
CD Basconia footballers
Bilbao Athletic footballers
Barakaldo CF footballers
SD Eibar footballers
Athletic Bilbao footballers
Real Valladolid players
SD Ponferradina players
Deportivo Alavés players
Athletic Bilbao non-playing staff
Basque Country international footballers